Andy Blythe and Marten Joustra are British composers who have collaborated on various TV, Production Music and game projects as part of their company, Swallow Studios. Their specialty is jazz, although they have also written in other genres. They are also known as Blythe Joustra.

Career
Blythe and Joustra have been composing music together for 25 years and in that time they have composed over 1000 pieces of music for television, radio, film, production music libraries and video. Joustra's background is as a classically trained pianist. He is a jazz pianist and has played in a variety of orchestras, rock bands, jazz quartets and a TV House band.

Blythe's background is in recording and production. Having started out as a drummer in various rock and pop bands, he opened and ran a commercial recording studio. It was through this that he and Joustra met. They quickly established a mutual ambition to write music for television and initially gained experience composing soundtracks for corporate videos, radio commercials, and live events.
Since then, they have contributed tracks to over 40 library music albums and written themes and incidental music for clients all over the world.

Aside from video game music, they wrote music and songs for the UK TV show Dick and Dom in da Bungalow, which aired between 2002 and 2006. A soundtrack CD of this music was released. The tune "Good Evening and Welcome" appeared on the Swedish TV-series "Ursäkta röran (vi bygger om)" by Filip Hammar and Fredrik Wikingsson. They have also written music for OOglies.

List of works

Video games

Film/TV

Production Music Library 

 As Heard On TV
 Atmosphere Music Library
 BBC Production Music
 Big Shorts
 Bruton
 Chappell
 Flexitracks
 Zoot

References

External links
 
 

British composers
British jazz composers
Living people
Video game composers
Year of birth missing (living people)